With/Avec is the second EP by Canadian indie rock band Plants and Animals, released in 2007 on Secret City Records.

Track listing
 Lola Who?
 Trials and Tribulations
 Faerie Dance
 Guru/Sinnerman

2007 EPs
Plants and Animals albums
Secret City Records albums